Douglas Dean Sisson (born September 20, 1963 in Titusville, Florida) is a former baseball player, coach, manager, and executive. He has worked at the college, minor league, and major league levels, and served from 2011–2012 as the first base coach for the Kansas City Royals.

Career
Sisson played baseball at Rollins College and the University of Montevallo.

He played professionally for two seasons.  He then served as a minor league manager  for the Texas Rangers, Anaheim Angels, and Montreal Expos organizations, winning several championships and Manager of the Year awards.  He served as the associate head coach of the Georgia Bulldogs baseball team in 2006 and 2007.

After coaching at Georgia, Sisson served as the field coordinator for the Royals' minor league system.  He was promoted to the major league coaching staff prior to the 2011 season.

Sisson was released of his major league coaching duties with the Kansas City Royals on August 4, 2012.

Personal
Sisson, his wife, Crickett, and daughters Tori and Delaney live in Auburn, Alabama.

References

External links

1963 births
Living people
Kansas City Royals coaches
Major League Baseball first base coaches
Minor league baseball managers
University of Montevallo alumni